Fajsławice  is a village in Krasnystaw County, Lublin Voivodeship, in eastern Poland. It is the seat of the gmina (administrative district) called Gmina Fajsławice.

The village has a population of 1,457.

The Battle of Fajsławice took place in the village during the January Uprising in 1863.

References

Villages in Krasnystaw County
Lublin Governorate